was a tanker launched in 1940 by Sun Shipbuilding for the Texas Oil Company; figured prominently in Operation Pedestal, the Allied resupply of Malta in World War II.

SS Ohio may also refer to the following ships:
 , a Norddeutscher Lloyd passenger liner launched in 1869 by Caird & Company
 , a passenger steamer launched in 1872 by William Cramp & Sons
 , a lake freighter launched in 1875 by John F. Squires
 , a Royal Mail Line steamer, later White Star Line's Albertic
 , a United States military supply ship, built as a naval tanker

See also

References

Ship names